Chaoshan or Teo-Swa (Teochew dialect: Diê5suan3 uê7, Shantou dialect: Dio5suan3 uê7) is a Southern Min language spoken by the Teochew people of the Chaoshan region of eastern Guangdong province, China, and by their diaspora around the world. It is closely related to Hokkien, with which it shares some cognates and phonology, and the two are mutually intelligible.

Chaoshan preserves many similarities to Old Chinese in its pronunciation and vocabulary that have been lost in most other Sinitic languages. As such, Chaoshan is considered to be one of the more conservative Chinese languages.

Classification
Chaoshan is a Southern Min language. As with other Sinitic languages, it is not mutually intelligible with Mandarin, Cantonese or Shanghainese. It has only limited intelligibility with Hokkien, with Chaoshan-speakers generally not recognizing Hokkien as a kindred language within the Chinese family. Even within the Chaoshan dialects, there is substantial variation in phonology between different regions and between different Chaoshan communities overseas.

Dialectologically, the Chaoshan dialects may be divided into three groups as defined by physically proximate areas:

 Chaozhou, including Chaozhou, Shantou, Jieyang, Nan'ao and Raoping cities and counties
Teochew dialect (Chaozhou)
Shantou dialect (Swatow)
Jieyang dialect
 Chaopu, including Puning and Huilai counties and Chaoyang district of Shantou County
Chaoyang dialect
Puning dialect
Huilai dialect
 Hailufeng, including Shanwei, Lufeng and Haifeng counties
Hailufeng dialect

History and geography

The Chaoshan region, which includes the twin cities of Chaozhou and Shantou, is where the standard variant of Chaoshan is spoken. Parts of the Hakka-speaking regions of Jiexi County, Dabu County and Fengshun, also contain pocket communities of Chaoshan speakers.

As Chaoshan was one of the major sources of Chinese emigration to Southeast Asia during the 18th to 20th centuries, a considerable Overseas Chinese community in that region is Chaoshan-speaking. In particular, the Chaoshan people settled in significant numbers in Cambodia, Thailand and Laos, where they form the largest Chinese sub-language group. Additionally, there are many Chaoshan-speakers among Chinese communities in Vietnam, Singapore, Malaysia (especially in the states of Johor and Selangor) and Indonesia (especially in West Kalimantan on Borneo). Waves of migration from Chaoshan to Hong Kong, especially after the communist victory of the Chinese Civil War in 1949, has also resulted in the formation of a community there, although most descendants now primarily speak Cantonese and English.

Chaoshan speakers are also found among overseas Chinese communities in Japan and the Western world (notably in the United States, Canada, Australia, United Kingdom, France and Italy), a result of both direct emigration from Chaoshan to these nations and secondary emigration from Southeast Asia.

In Singapore, Chaoshan remains the ancestral language of many Chinese Singaporeans, with Chinese of Chaoshan descent making up second largest Chinese group in Singapore, after the Hoklo. Despite this many Chaoshanese, particularly the younger generations are shifting towards English and Mandarin as their main spoken language. This is due to the Singapore government's stringent bilingual policy that promotes English as the official language of education, government and commerce and promotes Mandarin at the expense of other Chinese languages. Some Teochew assimilated with the larger Hokkien community and speak Hokkien rather than Chaoshan due to Hokkien's prominent role as a lingua franca  previously among the Singaporean Chinese community.

Relationship with Hokkien
Chaoshan and Hokkien are both Southern Min languages. Hokkien, which is spoken in southern Fujian, and Chaoshan share many phonetic similarities, due to historical influence, but have low lexical similarity. Although Chaoshan and Hokkien share some cognates, there are pronounced differences in most vowels with some consonant and tone shifts. Many of the vocabulary is distinct. For example, while Hokkien use the word beh to mean 'want', in Chaoshan the word ai, which means 'love', is also used to mean 'want'. Hokkien uses the word ia for 'very', while Chaoshan use the word kue, which also means 'to cross or to pass' in their language.
 
Other than the -p final found in both languages, Hokkien retains the different finals of -n, -ng, -t and -k while Chaoshan only has -ng and -k finals as a result of final-merging.

Chaoshan (Teochew and Swatow dialect) has only 51% intelligibility with the Tong'an Xiamen dialect of Hokkien (Cheng 1997), approximately the same as the percentage of intelligibility as between Russian and Ukrainian languages, while it has even lower mutual intelligibility language with other dialects of the Hokkien language.

Most Chaoshanese do not speak Hokkien and the majority of Hokkiens and Chaoshan both see themselves as a distinct groups. There are a minority of Chaoshanese who speak Hokkien as their mother tongue, most of whom have close contact or relatives in the neighbouring three originally-Teochew counties of what is now South Fujian, which were seceded to Fujian during the early Tang dynasty and subsequently assimilated into the Hokkien population. These Hokkien-speaking Teochews are more likely to treat Chaoshan simply as accented dialect of Hokkien. These people usually have a strong sense of Hokkien identity.

See also

 Southern Min
 Hokkien
 List of Chinese dialects

References

Sources
 Beijing daxue Zhongguo yuyan wenxue xi yuyanxue jiaoyanshi. (2003). Hànyǔ fāngyīn zìhuì. (Chinese dialectal vocabulary) Beijing: Yuwen chubanshe (北京大學中國語言文學系語言學教研室, 2003. 漢語方音字彙. 北京: 語文出版社) 
 Chappell, Hilary (ed.) (2001). Sinitic Grammar: Synchronic and Diachronic Perspectives. Oxford; New York: OUP 
 Chen, Matthew Y. (2000). Tone Sandhi: Patterns Across Chinese Dialects. Cambridge, England: CUP 
 DeFrancis, John. (1984). The Chinese Language: Fact and Fantasy. Honolulu: University of Hawaii Press 
 Norman, Jerry. [1988] (2002). Chinese. Cambridge, England: CUP 
 Ramsey, S. Robert (1986). Languages of China. Princeton, N.J.: Princeton University Press 
 Xu, Huiling (2007). Aspects of Chaoshan Grammar: A Synchronic Description of the Jieyang Dialect. Monograph Series Journal of Chinese Linguistics 22
 Yap, FoongHa; Grunow-Hårsta, Karen; Wrona, Janick  (ed.) (2011). "Nominalization in Asian Languages: Diachronic and typological perspectives". Hong Kong Polytechnic University /Oxford University : John Benjamins Publishing Company 

Chaoshan
Languages of China
Southern Min-language dialects
Teochew dialect